Sir Hugh Alexis Louis Rossi, KCSG, KHS, FKC (21 June 1927 – 14 April 2020) was a British Conservative Party politician. He was educated at Finchley Catholic Grammar School and King's College London (LLB).

His father, Gaudenzio Rossi, came to London in 1919 after serving in the Italian Army in the First World War. 

Rossi was elected a councillor on Hornsey Borough Council 1956–65, serving as deputy mayor 1964–65, and on the successor London Borough of Haringey from 1964. He was also a Middlesex County Councillor 1961–65. Rossi was Member of Parliament (MP) for Hornsey from 1966 to 1983, and (after boundary changes) for Hornsey and Wood Green, 1983 to 1992.

A junior minister in the governments of Edward Heath and Margaret Thatcher, he was on the 'One Nation' wing of the party. Michael Heseltine praised his social housing ideas (especially Right to Buy) as fundamental to Conservative general election successes.  He was expecting to be made Minister of State for Housing on the back of his work after the Conservatives won the 1979 general election but instead was made a Minister of State for Northern Ireland.  The Prime Minister Margaret Thatcher wrongly believed that his disappointment was a worry that he could not carry out this role as a Catholic, and arranged a meeting between Rossi and the Archbishop of Westminster Basil Hume to reassure him that there was no conflict of interest. 

He retired in 1992, after which the Conservative Party lost the Hornsey and Wood Green seat, when his successor as Conservative candidate, Andrew Boff, was defeated by the Labour Party's Barbara Roche.

Rossi was knighted in Thatcher's 1983 Dissolution Honours List.

He died in April 2020 at the age of 92 and was buried on the western side of Highgate Cemetery.

References

External links 

1927 births
2020 deaths
Burials at Highgate Cemetery
People educated at Finchley Grammar School
Alumni of King's College London
Fellows of King's College London
English people of Italian descent
Knights Bachelor
Conservative Party (UK) MPs for English constituencies
Councillors in Greater London
Councillors in the London Borough of Haringey
UK MPs 1966–1970
UK MPs 1970–1974
UK MPs 1974
UK MPs 1974–1979
UK MPs 1979–1983
UK MPs 1983–1987
UK MPs 1987–1992
People from Finchley
Northern Ireland Office junior ministers